Americans at War is a documentary series created by the U.S. Naval Institute. Each 90-second episode features a U.S. veteran recounting a defining moment from his or her time in the armed services. As of December 2007, the Institute has produced 40 episodes.

The vignettes have aired on PBS as individual segments and, on November 11, 2007, in a half-hour program containing 21 vignettes. In 2008, PBS will air three one-hour specials under the Americans at War banner. These will be Americans at War: Vietnam hosted by Joe Galloway, Americans at War: The Doolittle Raid hosted by David Hartman, and Americans at War: Pearl Harbor.

Interviewees
 Edwin C. Bearss
 George H. W. Bush
 Dan Buzzo
 Joe Galloway
 Thomas Griffin
 Fred Haynes
 James L. Holloway III
 Lew Hopkins
 Leo P. Jarboe
 George Juskalian
 Dusty Kleiss
 James Leavelle
 Charles McGee
 Jerry Miller
 John Ripley (USMC)
 Don Stratton
 Kermit Tyler
 Wilbur Wright
 Paul A. Yost, Jr.
 Richard Zimmerman

External links
https://www.youtube.com/AmericansAtWar
http://www.americans-at-war.com/

References

 http://www.americans-at-war.com/

Military history of the United States
Documentary television series about war